Sadhirskyi District was an urban district of Chernivtsi, named after the former settlement of Bukovina Sadhora. It is the northern district of Chernivtsi located on the left bank of Prut River.

Urban districts of Chernivtsi
Former raions of Chernivtsi Oblast
1965 establishments in Ukraine
2016 disestablishments in Ukraine